A Geordie is a person from the Tyneside region of England; the word is also used for the dialect spoken by such a person. It is a diminutive of the name George, Geordie is commonly found as a forename in the North-East of England and Southern Scotland.

Geordie may refer to:


Arts and entertainment
Geordie (ballad), a Child ballad, and the name of a character in it
Geordie (band), a 1970s British glam rock band
Geordie (film), a 1955 British film

People
Geordie (given name), a list of people with the given name or nickname

Other uses
Geordie, a nickname for Newcastle United F.C.
HMT Geordie – see List of requisitioned trawlers of the Royal Navy (WWII)

See also
Geordi La Forge, a Star Trek: The Next Generation character played by LeVar Burton
Geordie Shore, a British reality television series
Jordi (disambiguation)